Iowa Highway 175 (Iowa 175) is a main east–west route in the northern portion of the state. Iowa Highway 175 enters the state by a Missouri River crossing between Decatur, Nebraska and Onawa. The highway continues westward as Nebraska Highway 51. Iowa 175's eastern terminus is at a T intersection with U.S. Highway 63 (US 63) in southwestern Black Hawk County.

Despite Iowa 175's length, it only passes through small communities.  The largest city on the route is Onawa, whose 2020 census population was 2,906.

Route description
Iowa Highway 175 begins at the eastern end of the Burt County Missouri River Bridge west of Onawa.  At Onawa, it intersects Interstate 29.  At Turin, it meets Iowa 37 and turns northeast to follow an alignment which lies next to the Maple River.  It continues through Castana and meets Iowa 141 in Mapleton.  At Mapleton, Iowa 175 overlaps Iowa 141 through town.  This is a wrong-way concurrency, with eastbound Iowa 175 and westbound Iowa 141 routed on one side of the road, and vice versa.  It continues northeast from Mapleton through Danbury and Battle Creek and meets US 59 west of Ida Grove.  After passing through Ida Grove together with US 59, they separate east of Ida Grove.  Iowa 175 passes east through Arthur and at Odebolt, meets Iowa 39.  Further east, Iowa 175 meets US 71.  Iowa 175 and US 71 run east, then south, then east again concurrently through Lake View and Ulmer before separating at Auburn.

Iowa 175 leaves Auburn going east, then passes through Lake City.  After Lake City, Iowa 175 meets Iowa 4.  The two highways run concurrently through Lohrville before separating.  Iowa 175 then passes through Farnhamville and Gowrie and intersects Iowa 144 before intersecting US 169 at Harcourt.  They continue east together before separating before Dayton.  After passing through Stratford, Iowa 175 meets Iowa 17 at Stanhope.  It leaves Stanhope going east and meets US 69 south of Jewell.  They run together going north into Jewell before Iowa 175 turns east.  After passing through Ellsworth, Iowa 175 intersects Interstate 35.

Iowa Highway 175 then continues east of I-35 by passing through Radcliffe before meeting US 65 in Hubbard.  Iowa 175 and US 65 then go north, then east, together before separating.  Iowa 175 then goes east through Eldora and meets Iowa 14 west of Grundy Center.  Iowa 175 continues east with Iowa 14 before separating in Grundy Center.  It turns slightly southeasterly while passing through Morrison and Reinbeck, then turns east and ends at US 63 south of Hudson.

History

Iowa Highway 175 was originally designated in 1930 as a very short spur from US 65 to Hubbard but extended west to Stratford by 1937. Iowa 175 extended west to Auburn in October 1940, replacing Iowa 91, a spur route from Dayton to US 169, Iowa 47, a spur route from US 169 to Farnhamville (which had extended west from Gowrie on December 20, 1938), Iowa 287, a spur route from Farnhamville to Iowa 17 (now Iowa 4), and Iowa 188 (which was renumbered from Iowa 151 in 1938), which went from Iowa 17 to Auburn. In January 1948, Iowa 175 extended west to US 75, replacing Iowa 35 and a duplex with Iowa 37 was created; Iowa 37 would be truncated to Iowa 175 on May 11, 1966. By 1955 Iowa 175 had extended westward to Nebraska, replacing Iowa 165. The final segment of Highway 175 was commissioned in 1969, extending the highway eastward  from Hubbard to its present eastern terminus.

Major intersections

References

External links

The Iowa Highways Page: Highway 175
End of Iowa 175 at Iowa Highway Ends

175
Transportation in Monona County, Iowa
Transportation in Woodbury County, Iowa
Transportation in Ida County, Iowa
Transportation in Sac County, Iowa
Transportation in Calhoun County, Iowa
Transportation in Webster County, Iowa
Transportation in Hamilton County, Iowa
Transportation in Hardin County, Iowa
Transportation in Grundy County, Iowa
Transportation in Black Hawk County, Iowa